The 2021 Kilkenny Junior Hurling Championship was the 111th staging of the Kilkenny Junior Hurling Championship since its establishment by the Kilkenny County Board in 1905. The championship began on 26 September 2021 and ended on 14 November 2021.

The final was played on 14 November 2021 at UPMC Nowlan Park in Kilkenny, between Mooncoin and Tullogher-Rosbercon, in what was their first ever meeting in a final. Mooncoin won the match by 3-19 to 3-11 to claim their seventh championship title overall and a first title in five years.

Team changes

To Championship

Relegated from the Kilkenny Intermediate Hurling Championship
 St. Patrick's, Ballyragget

From Championship

Promoted to the Kilkenny Intermediate Hurling Championship
 Conahy Shamrocks

Results

Semi-finals

Final

References

External link

 Kilkenny GAA website

Kilkenny Junior Hurling Championship